"Lisa Baby" is a song by American hip hop artist Father MC, recorded for his debut album Father's Day. The single version of the song, which features R&B group Jodeci, was released in January 1991.

Track listings
12", Vinyl
"Lisa Baby" (Daddy Radio) - 3:53
"Lisa Baby" (Hip Hop Fat Mix) - 5:00
"Lisa Baby" (Smoothed Out Mix) - 4:44
"Lisa Baby" (Album Version) - 4:56
"Lisa Baby" (Swing House) - 6:50
"Lisa Baby" (Instrumental) - 5:29

CD (Promo)
"Lisa Baby" (Daddy Radio) - 3:53
"Lisa Baby" (Hip Hop Fat Mix) - 5:00
"Lisa Baby" (Smoothed Out Mix) - 4:44
"Lisa Baby" (Swing House) - 6:50
"Lisa Baby" (Instrumental) - 5:29

Personnel
Information taken from Discogs.
production – Mark Morales, Mark C. Rooney
remixing – DeVante Swing, Pete Rock
vocals – Jodeci
writing – Father MC, Mark Morales, Mark C. Rooney

Chart performance

Notes

External links

1991 singles
Father MC songs
1990 songs
Uptown Records singles
Songs written by Prince Markie Dee